The Magyar Nemzetkozi Motodrome (English: Hungarian National Motodrome) is a motorsport racetrack in Hajdúnánás, Debrecen, Hajdú-Bihar County, Hungary. Currently under construction, the circuit was designed to host the Hungarian motorcycle Grand Prix.

Description
After the failed Balatonring project, Hungary would once again try to build a circuit for MotoGP, this time to be built in Hajdúnánás near Debrecen. Construction began in the second quarter of 2021 to be built and was to be homologated by 2023, the year the Hungarian motorcycle Grand Prix had been expected to return. That grand prix would be postponed by a year.

It will also feature 15 turns and multiple elevation changes. The new track will also have two other shorter layouts.

References

Grand Prix motorcycle circuits
Motorsport venues in Hungary
Sports venues under construction
Sports venues in Debrecen